Matthew Ling (born 21 April 1999) is an Australian rules footballer who plays for the Sydney Swans in the Australian Football League (AFL). He was recruited by the Sydney Swans with the 14th draft pick in the 2017 AFL draft.
After his release from the Swans at the conclusion of the 2021 season, Ling returned to the area he was drafted from to play for the Geelong VFL.

Early football
Ling played for the Geelong Falcons in the NAB League for two seasons, picking up 250 disposals in total for the second season, where he played 14 games. He also played for Vic Country in the AFL Under 18 Championships for the 2017 season.

AFL career
After an injury-plagued first two years which saw Ling limited to just 16 games in the NEAFL for the 2018 and 2019 seasons, Ling debuted in the 8th round of the 2020 AFL season, against the Hawthorn Football Club. Ling picked up 10 disposals, 3 marks and 2 tackles on his debut. Ling was delisted by the Swans at the conclusion of the 2021 season.

Statistics
 Statistics are correct to the end of 2021

|- style="background-color: #eaeaea"
! scope="row" style="text-align:center" | 2018
|  || 19 || 0 || — || — || — || — || — || — || — || — || — || — || — || — || — || —
|- 
! scope="row" style="text-align:center" | 2019
|  || 19 || 0 || — || — || — || — || — || — || — || — || — || — || — || — || — || —
|- style="background-color: #EAEAEA"
! scope="row" style="text-align:center" | 2020
|style="text-align:center;"|
| 19 || 3 || 0 || 0 || 20 || 6 || 26 || 5 || 2 || 0.0 || 0.0 || 6.7 || 2.0 || 8.7 || 1.7 || 0.7
|- 
! scope="row" style="text-align:center" | 2021
|  || 19 || 1 || — || — || — || — || — || — || — || — || — || — || — || — || — || —
|- style="background:#EAEAEA; font-weight:bold; width:2em"
| scope="row" text-align:center class="sortbottom" colspan=3 | Career
| 4
| 0
| 0
| 20
| 6
| 26
| 5
| 2
| 0.0
| 0.0
| 6.7
| 2.0
| 8.7
| 1.7
| 0.7
|}

References

External links
 
 
 

1999 births
Living people
Sydney Swans players
Geelong Falcons players
Australian rules footballers from Geelong